Port Neuf National Forest was established by the U.S. Forest Service in Idaho on March 2, 1907  with .  On July 1, 1908 the forest was combined with Pocatello National Forest  and the name was discontinued.  The lands are presently included in Caribou National Forest.

References

External links
Forest History Society
Forest History Society:Listing of the National Forests of the United States Text from Davis, Richard C., ed. Encyclopedia of American Forest and Conservation History. New York: Macmillan Publishing Company for the Forest History Society, 1983. Vol. II, pp. 743-788.

Former National Forests of Idaho